The Desert Uplands is an interim Australian bioregion located in north and central western Queensland which straddles the Great Dividing Range between Blackall and Pentland.

Geography
The bioregion contains Lake Galilee, Lake Dunn and Lake Buchanan. The climate is semi-arid with highly variable rainfall.  Much of the area is used for cattle grazing and is part of the Great Artesian Basin, lying within both the Galilee and Eromanga Basins. The Brigalow Belt North and Brigalow Belt South are to the east of the bioregion, and the Einasleigh Uplands are located to the north.

Waterways
The main rivers in the bioregion are Belyando, Cape, Campaspe, Barcoo and Alice River and Aramac and Torrens Creeks. Wetlands at shallow salt lakes Lake Galilee and Lake Buchanan are listed on the Directory of Important Wetlands in Australia.

Subregions
Tbe Desert Uplands bioregion has four subregions: 
 Prairie-Torrens Creeks Alluvials (DEU01) – 
 Alice Tableland (DEU02) – 
 Cape-Campaspe Plains (DEU03) – 
 Jericho (DEU04) –

Flora
Spinifex grass is common. More than 80 weeds have been identified in the bioregion.

In 2003, it was estimated that 13 million trees per year were being destroyed in the Desert Uplands.  This placed the percentage of land cleared at 6.8%, the third highest for any Queensland bioregion.

Settlements
The two main settlements in the area are at Barcaldine and Aramac.

Protected areas
Protected areas in the Desert Uplands bioregion include:
 Cudmore National Park
 Forest Den National Park
 Great Basalt Wall National Park
 Moorrinya National Park
 White Mountains National Park
 Cudmore Resources Reserve
 White Mountains Resources Reserve
 Bellview Nature Refuge
 Bimblebox Nature Refuge
 Bygana West Nature Refuge
 Doongmabulla Mound Springs Nature Refuge
 Edgbaston Nature Refuge
 Strathtay Nature Refuge
 Toomba Nature Refuge
 Ulcanbah Nature Refuge

See also

Regions of Queensland

References

Biogeography of Queensland
IBRA regions
Lake Eyre basin
North Queensland
Central West Queensland